Amen is an American sitcom produced by Carson Productions that aired on NBC from September 27, 1986, to May 11, 1991. Set in Sherman Hemsley's real-life hometown of Philadelphia, Amen stars Hemsley as the deacon of a church and was part of a wave of successful sitcoms on NBC in the 1980s and early 1990s that featured predominantly black casts – others included The Cosby Show, A Different World, The Fresh Prince of Bel-Air,  and 227.

Premise
The series revolves around Ernest Frye, a widower deacon of the First Community Church of Philadelphia, who also works as a lawyer. He is often dishonest and frequently gets into trouble with his many harebrained schemes. Frye has a single daughter named Thelma. Reuben Gregory is the new, young pastor of the church, and also the object of Thelma's affection. The two get married during season four, despite the fact that Gregory and Frye often butt heads.  In the series finale, Thelma gives birth to the couple's first child.

Cast and characters
 Sherman Hemsley as Ernest Frye, a widowed deacon of the First Community Church in Philadelphia
 Clifton Davis as Reuben Gregory, the new pastor of the Community Church and Thelma's love interest
 Anna Maria Horsford as Thelma Frye Gregory, the Deacon's daughter and Reuben's eventual wife
 Roz Ryan as Amelia Hetebrink, the church secretary, Casietta's sister (both were chatterers and known as "the Hetebrink sisters")
 Jester Hairston as Rolly Forbes, the senior citizen, who often acts as the voice of reason 
 Barbara Montgomery as Casietta Hetebrink (1986–90), the church trustee, Amelia's sister
 Elsa Raven as Inga (1988–90), the Deacon's Swedish housekeeper 
Tony T. Johnson as Chris (1988-1991), a young boy, the Deacon's neighbor
 Rosetta LeNoire as Leola Henderson Forbes (1987–89), Rolly's love interest and eventual wife
 Montrose Hagins as Leola Henderson Forbes (1989–91), Rolly's wife
 Bumper Robinson as Clarence (1990–91), a young street kid and protégé of Deacon Frye

Exterior shot location
The Mount Pisgah African Methodist Episcopal Church in Philadelphia, a stone gothic church building, was used for exterior views of the First Community Church. Consequently, the Mount Pisgah Church became known to the nation as the "Amen Church".

Episodes

Ratings
 1986–1987: #13
 1987–1988: #15
 1988–1989: #25
 1989–1990: #54
 1990–1991: #60

References

External links

1986 American television series debuts
1991 American television series endings
1980s American sitcoms
1980s American black sitcoms
1990s American black sitcoms
English-language television shows
NBC original programming
Television series by Universal Television
Television shows set in Philadelphia
Television series created by Ed. Weinberger
Television series by Carson Productions
Religious comedy television series